Sainte-Marie-de-Kent (most often referred to as Sainte-Marie) is an unincorporated Canadian village located at the intersection of Route 515 and Route 525 in Kent County, New Brunswick.  It is in the parish of Saint Mary.

The village is located 45 km north of Moncton and its residents are largely Acadians, most of whom speak French in its local variant Chiac.

Sainte-Marie-de-Kent is the site of the  Kent County Agricultural Fair, one of New Brunswick's oldest and largest agricultural fairs, a five-day event which has been held annually since 1956, during the final full week of August.

History

Notable people

See also
List of communities in New Brunswick

References

Communities in Kent County, New Brunswick